Between Two Ferns with Zach Galifianakis is an American talk show hosted by comedian Zach Galifianakis which features celebrity guests. Episodes last several minutes, in which the interviewer (Galifianakis) and guests trade barbs and insults. In addition to the online series, there is a Comedy Central television special, and a Netflix original movie Between Two Ferns: The Movie.

Format
As the show's title suggests, host Zach Galifianakis interviews celebrities while sitting between two potted ferns. The set intentionally resembles a low-budget amateur production for public-access television, with on-screen graphics containing deliberate comedic errors. For example, in a 2014 episode, Brad Pitt's name is spelled "Bart Pit" and his film 12 Years a Slave—the winner of the 2013 Academy Award for Best Picture—entitled "12 Years a Salve".

Galifianakis maintains a very awkward and often antagonistic demeanor with his guests, asking them bizarre, inappropriate or insulting questions mixed with offhand non-sequiturs. The guests' responses are mostly improvised, despite pre-interviews. Episodes often include a segment in which Galifianakis awkwardly interrupts his guests to promote a sponsor's product. Examples include bananas, the video game Need for Speed: Shift, and (most frequently) Speed Stick deodorant. Some advertisements, like the graphics, are based around aspects of or events related to the interviewee. For example, the episode featuring Hillary Clinton included one of Donald Trump's campaign commercials.

History and reception

The show originated as a short film on Scott Aukerman and B. J. Porter's Fox sketch pilot The Right Now! Show, a spin-off of their Comedy Death-Ray live show. After the network declined to pick up the show, the duo put the short up on the website Funny Or Die, where it made a successful transition to an internet series.

Discussing the show on ABC News Now, Galifianakis said, "The ic way that Hollywood machine runs – it's fun to make fun of it. That's how Between Two Ferns started." Guests aren't told what will happen in advance, according to Galifianakis, "They agree to come. There is no discussion beforehand...It just happens, no real prep, no organization whatsoever." He continues, "Inappropriateness is really fun to me...That is kind of the take on Between Two Ferns – inappropriate humor."

The Chicago Tribune described it as "surreal improv...a talk show that's more of a charming critique of the faked intimacy of celebrity interviews than a talk show."

A 30-minute television special, Between Two Ferns: A Fairytale of New York, aired on Comedy Central on May 6, 2012. The show featured interviews with Tina Fey, Jon Stewart, and Richard Branson.

The episode featuring President Barack Obama was timed to encourage Americans to sign up for health insurance at Healthcare.gov. Funnyordie.com became the top referrer to the government site during this time. The September 2013 episode featuring Justin Bieber also received significant media attention. The show opened with Galifianakis telling him, "It's really exciting to talk to you. Especially right in the middle of your public meltdown."

In the 2014 episode featuring Brad Pitt, the actor was referred to as both "Bradley Pitts" and "Bart Pit", and Galifianakis referred to Pitt's latest film, Fury as "Furry", and asked Pitt, "Is it hard for you to maintain a suntan...because you live in your wife's shadow?" Galifianakis also asked Pitt if his relationship with wife, Angelina Jolie, was anything like "Ross and Rachel" from Friends, the show that made a star of Pitt's ex-wife, Jennifer Aniston.

In a January 2016 interview with the Los Angeles Times, while promoting Baskets, Galifianakis discussed the status of Between Two Ferns, stating: "I don't know what else to do ... [Between Two Ferns has] kind of run its course a bit." Galifianakis also expressed his desire to interview the Pope on the show. Between Two Ferns' first new episode in almost two years aired in September 2016. It featured then-presidential candidate Hillary Clinton and received over 30 million views in its first 24 hours, the highest viewership in FunnyorDie.com's history.

Between Two Ferns: The Movie, a film adaptation of the show directed by Aukerman and written by Galifianakis and Aukerman, premiered on Netflix on September 20, 2019. Uncut interviews from the film featuring David Letterman, Paul Rudd, Awkwafina, Benedict Cumberbatch, Brie Larson, Keanu Reeves, Hailee Steinfeld, and Adam Scott were released on the Netflix Is A Joke YouTube channel and FunnyOrDie.com under the title Between Two Ferns with Zach Galifianakis: The Movie, Sorta Uncut Interviews, which received a Primetime Emmy Award for Outstanding Short Form Variety Series nomination.

Episodes

Special (2012)
A special episode aired on television on Comedy Central on May 6, 2012.

Awards

References

External links

2008 web series debuts
American television talk shows
American comedy web series
Emmy Award-winning programs
Funny or Die
Streamy Award-winning channels, series or shows